Marian Cosmescu (born 3 October 1950) is a Romanian modern pentathlete. He competed at the 1972 Summer Olympics.

References

1950 births
Living people
Romanian male modern pentathletes
Olympic modern pentathletes of Romania
Modern pentathletes at the 1972 Summer Olympics
Sportspeople from Bucharest